TH-PVP is a substituted cathinone derivative which has been sold as a designer drug. It was first identified by a forensic laboratory in Hungary in 2015, but has subsequently been found in numerous other countries around the world including Spain, Belgium, Poland, Turkey and Brazil. Pharmacological studies in vitro showed it to inhibit reuptake and promote the release of monoamine neurotransmitters with some selectivity for serotonin, but it failed to produce stimulant effects in animals, and has a pharmacological profile more comparable to that of sedating empathogens such as MDAI and 5-Methyl-MDA.

See also 
 4-Et-PVP
 6-APT
 EDMA
 Indapyrophenidone
 Naphyrone
 O-2390

References 

Designer drugs
Serotonin-norepinephrine-dopamine releasing agents
Pyrrolidinophenones